The Cyprus Billie Jean King Cup team represents Cyprus in the Billie Jean King Cup tennis competition and are governed by the Cyprus Tennis Federation.  They have not competed since 2005.

History
Cyprus competed in its first Fed Cup in 1995.  They have won one of 30 ties played (vs. Kenya in 1999).

See also
Fed Cup
Cyprus Davis Cup team

External links

Billie Jean King Cup teams
Fed Cup
Tennis